Specialusis Ugdymas is a monthly Scopus indexed journal. Specialusis Ugdymas means special education.

References

English-language journals
Academic journals associated with learned and professional societies
Monthly journals
Special education journals